Mähkli is a settlement in Antsla Parish, Võru County in southeastern Estonia. As of the 2021 census, the population was 32.

References

External links 
Satellite map at Maplandia.com

Villages in Võru County